Nazemabad or Nazimabad is a village in Gojal tehsil, Hunza District, Gilgit-Baltistan in Pakistan.  It is close to Gircha.  There are around 800 people who are mostly Wakhi.

References 

Populated places in Hunza District